Allidothrips is a genus of thrips in the family Phlaeothripidae.

Species
 Allidothrips cinctus
 Allidothrips tricolor

References

Phlaeothripidae
Thrips
Thrips genera